Sunny is an upcoming dark comedy television series based on the novel The Dark Manual by Colin O'Sullivan.

Premise
A woman living in Kyoto whose husband and son vanished in a plane crash is gifted a domesticated robot from her husband's robotics company.

Cast
 Rashida Jones as Suzie Sakamoto
 Hidetoshi Nishijima as Masa Sakamoto, Suzie's husband and a roboticist
 Joanna Sotomura as Sunny
 annie the clumsy as Mixxy, Suzie's friend and an aspiring mixologist
 You as Hime
 Judy Ongg as Noriko Sakamoto, Masa's mother
 Jun Kunimura as Yuki Tanaka, a roboticist

Production
In February 2022, Apple TV+ announced it had given Sunny a series order. Rashida Jones is set to star in and executive produce the series, which is set to film in Japan. In July, Hidetoshi Nishijima joined the cast. In October, Joanna Sotomura, annie the clumsy, You, Judy Ongg, and Jun Kunimura were added to the cast.

Filming for the series began in Japan in July 2022.

References

External links
 

Apple TV+ original programming
Television shows filmed in Japan
Upcoming television series